China floods may refer to:

Flooding in China
Great Flood (China), ancient